James Wells (1758 – 1807) was an English cricketer. Wells was the brother of cricketer John Wells.

Wells made his first-class debut for a team representing Hampshire against an early England team. Wells played seven times for Hampshire sides as well as ten times for Surrey teams. His final match for Surrey came in 1800 against England. Wells also played a single first-class match for a side representing Kent in 1793, against the Marylebone Cricket Club. In addition to playing first-class cricket for the above sides, he also represented Hampshire and Sussex, TA Smith's XI, N to Z and England.

References

Bibliography
 Arthur Haygarth, Scores & Biographies, Volume 1 (1744–1826), Lillywhite, 1862

English cricketers
Hampshire cricketers
Surrey cricketers
Kent cricketers
English cricketers of 1787 to 1825
English cricketers of 1701 to 1786
1758 births
1807 deaths